The following is a list of FC Chernihiv records and statistics for this Ukrainian football club.

Player records and statistics

Appearances
Most goals in all competitions:  Dmytro Myronenko, 121 matches
Most goals in all competitions as Foreigner:  Teymuraz Mchedlishvili, 108 matches

Goalkeepers
 Most appearances in all competitions:  Artem Lutchenko, 27 matches
 Most appearances goalkeeper with dual citizenship:   Oleksandr Shyray, 40 matches

Goalscorers  
Most goals in all competitions:  Dmytro Myronenko, 16 goals
Most goals in all competitions as Foreigner:  Teymuraz Mchedlishvili, 15 goals

Managerial records
 Longest-serving manager:  Vadym Postovoy (15 years)

Most capped players

Honours
Chernihiv Oblast Football Championship
   Winners (1): 2019   Runners-up (2): 2011, 2014
   Third Place (3): 2013, 2017, 2018Chernihiv Oblast Football Cup  Winners (1): 2012
  Runners-up (1) 2016

Foreign players
The List of Foreign Players of FC Chernihiv.

Foreigners

Dual citizenship

Other

References

Ukrainian football club statistics
Association football club records and statistics
FC Chernihiv